Albina Yelkina (29 December 1932 – 20 March 2009) was a Soviet athlete. She competed in the women's discus throw at the 1956 Summer Olympics.

References

External links

1932 births
2009 deaths
Athletes (track and field) at the 1956 Summer Olympics
Soviet female discus throwers
Olympic athletes of the Soviet Union
Place of birth missing